The blue-crowned chlorophonia (Chlorophonia occipitalis) is a species of bird in the family Fringillidae. It is found in El Salvador, Panama, Guatemala, Honduras, Mexico, and Nicaragua. Its natural habitat is subtropical or tropical moist montane forest.

References

Further reading

blue-crowned chlorophonia
Birds of Mexico
Birds of Guatemala
Birds of Honduras
blue-crowned chlorophonia
blue-crowned chlorophonia
Taxonomy articles created by Polbot